The KFM 112M is a four-cylinder, four-stroke, dual ignition, horizontally opposed aircraft engine designed for ultralight aircraft and motor gliders.

The engine was designed and produced by the KFM (Komet Flight Motor) Aircraft Motors Division of Italian American Motor Engineering of Italy as a follow-on engine to their KFM 107 series and has been out of production since 1990.

Development
The KFM 112 is a conventional four-cylinder engine that is very compact and lightweight at only , including the starter, alternator and carburetor. The engine features dual electronic ignition, a single OVC carburetor, hydraulic valve lifters, nickel-silicon treated cylinders and bi-metallic valves with chromed stems. It was offered without a reduction system. Starting is electric starter only.

Applications
Partenavia P.86 Mosquito

Specifications (112M)

See also

References

1980s aircraft piston engines